Kazuaki Yoshinaga (吉永一明, Yoshinaga Kazuaki, born March 17, 1968, in Fukuoka, Japan) is a Japanese coach.  He is the current head coach at Albirex Niigata.

Coaching career
Yoshinaga was a coach for the main team at Ventforet Kofu in 2016.  He was also the head coach of Yamanashi Gakuin Senior High School Soccer Club from 2010 to 2015. 

Yoshinaga was appointed head coach of Albirex Niigata Singapore in 2017. He won the S.League title in 2017, and also won S.League coach of the year.  He extended his contract with the Swans for another year, and the next season saw Yoshinaga led Albirex to win all titles in Singapore professional football: Singapore Premier League, Singapore Cup and Singapore Community Shield, while he won the league's coach of the year for the second successive year.

Due to his impressive work with Albirex Niigata Singapore, he returned to Japan in 2019 as the parent club Albirex Niigata appointed him initially as their academy manager. After first-team manager Koichiro Katafuchi resigns in April the same year, Yoshinaga was appointed as his successor.

Yoshinaga served as Albirex Niigata's manager till January 2020, following which he took charge of the U18 side, before returning to his post of Academy Manager.

In April 2021, Yoshinaga returned to Albirex Niigata Singapore as the Technical Director, before becoming the Manager once again in 2022.

References

External links

1968 births
Living people
Japanese footballers
Japanese football managers
Singapore Premier League head coaches
Association football forwards
Albirex Niigata Singapore FC managers
J2 League managers
Albirex Niigata managers